Danny Williams (born 25 January 1988) is an English professional footballer who plays as a left winger.

Williams spent his early career in the English non-league, playing for Daisy Hill, FC United of Manchester, Clitheroe, Kendal Town and Chester. He turned professional in 2013 with Scottish club Inverness Caledonian Thistle, and also spent time at Dundee, before returning to England in 2018 with Accrington Stanley. He later spent time back in the English non-league with AFC Fylde and FC Halifax Town.

Career
Williams moved from Clitheroe to Kendal Town in February 2011, having previously played for Daisy Hill and FC United of Manchester. At FC United he had scored two goals in 33 appearances in all competitions. He joined Chester on loan in October 2012, scoring two goals in 28 appearances in the Conference North.

He was linked with a move to Scottish club Inverness Caledonian Thistle in May 2013, and the move was finalised in August 2013. Despite a slow start to his career at the start of the season, Williams signed a new two-year contract with the club. On 14 January 2014, Williams scored his first professional goal, as Inverness Caledonian Thistle beat Aberdeen 1–0. Williams came on as a substitute as Inverness won the 2015 Scottish Cup Final.

On 22 March 2016, Dundee announced that Williams had signed a pre-contract agreement with the club along with fellow Inverness teammate James Vincent. Williams left Dundee in November 2017, and signed for Accrington Stanley in January 2018. He was offered a new contract by Accrington at the end of the 2017–18 season. He moved on loan to AFC Fylde in October 2018.

He was released by Accrington at the end of the 2018–19 season. He signed for FC Halifax Town in August 2019.

Career statistics

Honours
Chester
Conference North: 2012–13
Cheshire Senior Cup: 2013
Inverness Caledonian Thistle
Scottish Cup: 2014–15

References

1988 births
Living people
English footballers
Daisy Hill F.C. players
F.C. United of Manchester players
Clitheroe F.C. players
Kendal Town F.C. players
Chester F.C. players
Inverness Caledonian Thistle F.C. players
Dundee F.C. players
National League (English football) players
Scottish Professional Football League players
Association football wingers
Accrington Stanley F.C. players
English Football League players
FC Halifax Town players